Midnight Queen may refer to:

A song by Sarcófago from the album The Laws of Scourge
A song by Nickelback from the album Here and Now
A song by Goo Hara
A song by Inkubus Sukkubus from the album Belladonna & Aconite
Betty Thomas, nicknamed "The Midnight Queen"